James Winslow (born 16 April 1983) is a British professional car racing driver who races at Le Mans 24 Hours. A ten-time Motorsport champion member of the British Racing Drivers' Club, he competes in Europe, Australia & Asia in Le Mans LMP & GT cars. He represented Great Britain in A1 Grand Prix the World Cup of Motorsport. Awarded the Royal Humane Award in 2007 by Queen Elizabeth II, for saving the life of a fellow driver trapped in his burning race car, he gained international attention and many bravery awards followed before featuring in the BBC's 'Accidental Heroes' TV Series. He currently holds the record for the most Formula 3 open-wheeler wins after a tally of 86 victories, and ranked in the Top 10 'Most Victories of all time' listings for British drivers.

Racing career

2004–2008
In 2004, Winslow won the British ARP Formula 3 Championship in 2004, winning 10 races driving an older model car. He then went on and won the Asian Formula Three Championship and also won the Australia Grand Prix Formula 3 support race in 2006 beating Bruno Senna and Tim Macrow. In 2007, he won races in both the Australian Formula Three Championship and the Formula V6 Asia championships. In September 2007, he took part in a Champ Car test at Sebring International Raceway with a view to securing a full-time drive in 2008, but the series ultimately folded.

Winslow, driving for Team Meritus, won the Formula Asia V6 Championship at the last round of the season in Zhuhai, China, beating Armaan Ebrahim. Winslow had the chance to test drive a World Series by Renault race car at Paul Ricard test track on 8 and 9 November 2007 as the prize for winning the championship. He returned to the Australian Formula 3 for 2008 winning six times and taking the overall championship at the final round. He also won the final of the three the Formula 3 showcase races on the streets of Surfers Paradise in support of the Nikon Indy 300 IndyCar race.

2009–2010
Winslow then participated as a "Rookie Driver" for A1 Team Great Britain in A1 Grand Prix with a best result of 2nd. In 2009 Winslow drove in the American Atlantic Championship series for four different teams (primarily Genoa Racing) where his best result was 3rd and finished 6th after missing two events without a DNF.

For 2010 Winslow signed with Sam Schmidt Motorsports to drive in the Firestone Indy Lights series; a development category sanctioned by the Indy Racing League. Winslow made 6 starts for the team from 12 rounds, all on road and street courses, and finished 14th in points with a best finish of 3rd at Watkins Glen.

2011
The start of the 2011 Indy Lights season saw Winslow drive for Andretti Autosport for the opening four rounds of the 2011 Indy Lights season championship at St. Petersburg and Barber Motorsports Park.

At the St Petersburg race, which was Winslow's first time in the Andretti Autosport car, he ran well through the weekend, but mayhem early in the race saw him suffer damage to the front wing while running 3rd, which forced him to pit and finish tenth.

At the Barber Motorsports Park race, Winslow ran 3rd for the duration of the 50-minute race until after a caution period he was hit from behind on the restart and forced to retire.

The Long Beach event was Winslow's best race with Andretti Autosport running first in practice and qualified at the front after a nasty accident in qualifying. Winslow ran well in the race and after an eventful race come home in 4th position. The Freedom 100 was the final race of Winslow's 2011 season in Indy Lights. He qualified fifth but crashed out of the 40 lap race on lap 20 in what would be his first and only oval start.

2012
The start of the 2012 season saw Winslow join a new team R-Tek Motorsport in the Australian Formula 3 Championship for a full season. Winslow won 12 races, breaking the record for the most wins in a single season in the 57-year history of the Australian Gold Star Awarded series and went on to dominate the Australian Formula 3 series winning the Championship for a second time at Queensland Raceway with a clean sweep of pole position, 3 race wins and a new lap record.

Outside racing
Winslow was featured on BBC One TV programme Accidental Heroes on 25 September 2008, for his rescue of former rival in the Asian Formula Three Championship Moreno Suprapto, after the two collided in a round of the championship, at Sentul in Indonesia.

Racing record

Complete A1 Grand Prix results
(key) (Races in bold indicate pole position) (Races in italics indicate fastest lap)

American open–wheel racing results
(key)

Atlantic Championship

Indy Lights

Complete 24 Hours of Le Mans results

Complete European Le Mans Series results

References

External links
Official Website

1983 births
24 Hours of Le Mans drivers
Formula V6 Asia drivers
Asian Formula Three Championship drivers
Australian Formula 3 Championship drivers
A1 Grand Prix Rookie drivers
Supercars Championship drivers
Atlantic Championship drivers
Indy Lights drivers
Living people
Asian Le Mans Series drivers
24H Series drivers
Formula Ford drivers
British Formula Three Championship drivers
Trans-Am Series drivers
European Le Mans Series drivers
FIA World Endurance Championship drivers
Eurasia Motorsport drivers
Graff Racing drivers
Andretti Autosport drivers
A1 Grand Prix drivers
A1 Team Great Britain drivers
Greaves Motorsport drivers
Conquest Racing drivers
Team Meritus drivers
KCMG drivers
Arrow McLaren SP drivers
Ombra Racing drivers
Le Mans Cup drivers